David Descalzo Álvarez (died 27 July 2004) was a Peruvian basketball player. He competed in the men's tournament at the 1948 Summer Olympics.

References

External links
 

Year of birth missing
2004 deaths
Peruvian men's basketball players
Olympic basketball players of Peru
Basketball players at the 1948 Summer Olympics
Place of birth missing
1950 FIBA World Championship players
20th-century Peruvian people